Cepora temena is a butterfly in the family Pieridae. It is found in Indonesia.

Subspecies
The following subspecies are recognised:
Cepora temena temena (Lombok)
Cepora temena tamar Wallace, 1867 (Java, Bali)
Cepora temena lenitas Fruhstorfer, 1910 (Sumbawa)
Cepora temena hyele Fruhstorfer, 1910 (Lembata)

References

Pierini
Butterflies described in 1861
Butterflies of Indonesia
Taxa named by William Chapman Hewitson